Grotta del Gelo ("Cave of Frost") is a volcanic cave of Mount Etna which is known for the presence of a large amount of ice. The cave formed in 1614-1624 during a large eruption of the volcano, inside one of the lava flows produced during that eruption. Within the two subsequent decades, ice grew and accumulated in the cave. Today it is a tourist destination.

Geography and geomorphology 

Grotta del Gelo lies at - elevation on Etna's northern/northwestern flank, in the municipality of Randazzo and within the Etna National Park. The cave can be reached by foot from Piano Provenzana. There are also two volcanic cones, Monte Nero and Monte Pizzillo, and the vents of the 1923 and 1947 eruptions in the area. The first record of the cave is found in Sartorius von Walterhausen's 1880 work, as "Bocche del Gelo".

Cave 

The cave formed during the 1614-1624 eruption of Etna, which formed the "lava dei Dammusi" lava flows on Etna's western flank. Part of this lava flow system is the "Sciara del Follone" that contains the cave. The surface of the lava flows, exposed to the air, cooled and solidified to form a crust on the remaining flow. These crusts were left behind when the still-flowing lava in the cavities drained, leaving cavities of various shapes and sizes. Due to the great thickness of the lava flow –  on average – it probably took at least a decade for it to cool sufficiently for ice to form within.

Ice 

The ice is decorated with stalagmites, stalactites and ice columns. It fills the deeper parts of the cave. This body of ice has been called a glacier. 

Ice also forms in the Grotta del Lago lava cave above Grotta del Gelo, but it thaws during summer and is thus not perennial.

Ice changes 

The ice within the cave began to form during the Maunder Minimum, within two decades from the formation of the cave – probably during the second half of the 17th century. The ice mass in the cave increased until the 1980s and then declined due to the combined effect of climate change and an eruption in 1981 which occurred close to the cave and changed its temperature regime. The shape of the ice body has also changed over time; at some time after the 1990s a gallery formed in the ice, which then disappeared again. A phase of increased ice volume during and after 2014 has been linked to heavy snowfall.

Use and scientific research 

The cave was used as a source of water by farmers, who brought their animals there. Despite being locally known for centuries, it does not appear to have been documented systematically until the late 20th century. The first known written reference was to the Bocche de Gelo ("Mouth of Frost") in 1880. Beginning in the 1970s the cave became a tourist attraction for hikers, which led to increasing scientific interest and investigations from the 1980s onwards. Its interior was monitored and investigated from 1997 to 2000, and in 2013 a new and improved sensor network was installed by researchers to track the cave's atmospheric humidity and temperature.

It is probably the best known cave at Etna and of great volcano-speleological importance. Legends talk of the existence of a treasure at Grotta del Gelo; such legends are common for the volcanic caves at Etna.

References

Sources 

 
 
 

Caves of Italy
Glaciers of Italy
Ice caves
Lava tubes
Randazzo